Leith North railway station served the area of Leith, Edinburgh, Scotland, from 1879 to 1962 on the Leith North Passenger Branch.

History 
The station was opened as Leith on 1 August 1879 by the Caledonian Railway. Beyond the buffer stops was a train shed, to the west was a siding and on the south side of the line was the signal box, which was named 'Leith Passenger' when the station opened. The station's name was changed to North Leith on 1 August 1903 and changed again to Leith North on 7 April 1952. It closed on 30 April 1962.

References 

Disused railway stations in Edinburgh
Former Caledonian Railway stations
Railway stations in Great Britain opened in 1879
Railway stations in Great Britain closed in 1962
1879 establishments in Scotland
1962 disestablishments in Scotland